The enzyme tyrosine decarboxylase catalyzes the chemical reaction

L-tyrosine  tyramine + CO2

Hence, this enzyme has one substrate, L-tyrosine, and two products, tyramine and carbon dioxide.

This enzyme belongs to the family of lyases, specifically the carboxy-lyases, which cleave carbon-carbon bonds.  The systematic name of this enzyme class is L-tyrosine carboxy-lyase (tyramine-forming). Other names in common use include L-tyrosine decarboxylase, L-(−)-tyrosine apodecarboxylase, and L-tyrosine carboxy-lyase.  This enzyme participates in tyrosine metabolism and alkaloid biosynthesis.  It employs one cofactor, pyridoxal phosphate.

References 

 

EC 4.1.1
Pyridoxal phosphate enzymes
Enzymes of unknown structure